Ballela is a small village and parish in County Down, Northern Ireland. A number of prehistoric ringforts begird the village.

Name 
Ballela is within the townland of Ballooly, which was historically spelt as Ballyely. It is believed that these three names all come .

GAA 
The Ballela area has a long link with Gaelic games, and hurling was first played in Ballela as far back as 1901. The first County Down Senior Hurling Championship win for Ballela Hurling and Camogie Club (Baile Aileach Cumann Lúthchleas Gael) came in the 1936 final played in Castlewellan against Kilclief. Further titles were won in 1937, 1940, 1941, 1948, 1951 and 1952.  New playing fields, meeting rooms and changing facilities were developed during 2005 and the pitch was officially opened in 2007.
Won the county junior championship in 2015. The club is among the highest Down hurling clubs and has the 5th most Down senior hurling titles behind Portaferry and followed by Leitrim Fontenoys.

Education 
A National School that existed at Ballela in 1837 was described as “a small cottage” with 100 Catholic and 10 Presbyterian pupils. A new school in the townland of Shanrod was opened in 1859 and extended in 1861. It became the Catholic school for Ballela for several generations. A new school at Ballela was opened in September 1969 and shut in June 2006. It was between the curate's house and the Parochial Hall.

References

Villages in County Down